Tajabad-e Do may refer to:
 Tajabad-e Do, Kahnuj